Jamie Fox is a Native American musician of the Assiniboine and Gros Ventre people, who is a well-known performer of the Métis fiddle tradition of Montana. 

Jamie Fox is a member of the Fox family of fiddlers from the Fort Belknap reservation. She has performed widely in the United States and Europe, where she has collaborated with her husband, Kristian Bugge, a Danish traditional fiddler, and also with old-time fiddler Ruthie Dornfeld.

Fox studied with Montana fiddler Marvin "Fatty" Morin and learned his bowing technique.

References

Living people
21st-century Native Americans
21st-century violinists
American fiddlers
Assiniboine people
Gros Ventre people
Native American musicians
North American folk music
People from Montana
Year of birth missing (living people)
People from Fort Belknap Indian Reservation